Grant is a small village in the hills north of Grahovo ob Bači in the Municipality of Tolmin in the Littoral region of Slovenia.

Name
Grant was attested in historical sources as Grant in 1377, Granndt in 1515, and Grandt in 1523, among other spellings. The name is derived from either Middle High German grant 'trough, channel' (referring to a terrain feature) or possibly Middle High German *grant (< Old High German grente), referring to gravelly soil.

References

External links 
Grant on Geopedia

Populated places in the Municipality of Tolmin